The 2012–13 UAB Blazers men's basketball team represented the University of Alabama at Birmingham during the 2012–13 NCAA Division I men's basketball season. The Blazers, led by first year head coach Jerod Haase, played their home games at Bartow Arena and were members of Conference USA. They finished the season 16–17, 7–9 in C-USA play to finish in a tie for seventh place. They lost in the quarterfinals of the Conference USA tournament to Southern Miss.

Roster

Schedule

|-
!colspan=9| Exhibition

|-
!colspan=9| Regular season

|-
!colspan=9| 2013 Conference USA men's basketball tournament

|-

References

UAB Blazers men's basketball seasons
UAB